Chris Evert and Olga Morozova were the defending champions, but competed this year with different partners.

Evert (partnering Martina Navratilova) successfully defended her title by defeating Morozova (partnering Julie Anthony) with a score of 6–3, 6–2.

Seeds
Both seeds received a bye into the second round.
  Julie Anthony /  Olga Morozova (final)
  Chris Evert /  Martina Navratilova (champions)

Draw

Finals

Top half

Bottom half

References
 Official results archive (WTA)

External links
1975 French Open – Women's draws and results at the International Tennis Federation

Women's Doubles
French Open by year – Women's doubles
French Open - Women's Doubles
1975 in women's tennis
1975 in French women's sport